The 1989 Superbike World Championship was the second FIM Superbike World Championship season. The season started on 27 March at Donington Park and finished on 19 November at Manfeild Autocourse after 11 rounds.

American Fred Merkel won his second riders' championship and Honda won the manufacturers' championship.

Race calendar and results

Championship standings

Riders' standings

Manufacturers' standings

Notes
 The points allocation system was: 1st=20, 2nd=17, 3rd=15, 4th=13, 5th=11, 6th=10, 7th=9, 8th=8, 9th=7, 10th=6, 11th=5, 12th=4, 13th=3, 14th=2, 15th=1

References

Superbike racing
Superbike World Championship seasons